Janet Fragoso Alonso (born January 14, 1973) is a Mexican professional wrestler, known by her ringname Miss Janeth, who is a longtime ruda for Asistencia Asesoría y Administración. She has also competed in the Universal Wrestling Association and won the UWA World Women's Championship following its revival in 2001. Fragoso is the younger sister of luchadora Zuleyma

Career
Fragoso's career with the promotion stretches back to the early 1990s, her first major victory in the promotion being a "hair vs. hair" match against Migala in 1996, however she remained at a mid-card level for much of her time in the AAA's women's division. Another highlight in her early career occurred two years later when she and Alda Moreno beat Rosy Moreno and Xóchitl Hamada in a "hair vs. hair" match at Verano de Escandalo (1998) when Janeth pinned Rosy Moreno.

The next year, Janeth entered Reina de Reina 1999 and in the opening rounds defeated Lady Discovery, Princess Sujei and Migala in a "four-way" elimination match. In the finals, she lost to Xochitl Hamada in a similar match which included Esther and Rosy Moreno. Her appearance at Verano de Escandalo (1999) saw her team with rivals Rosy Moreno and Xochitl Hamada to beat Cinthia, Alda & Esther Moreno. Another trios match with Tiffany and Rosy Moreno at Guerra de Titanes 1999 resulted in a loss to Faby Apache, Alda & Cinthia Moreno.

She entered the Reina de Reina 2000 defeating Alda Moreno in the opening rounds but lost to Martha Villalobos in the semi-finals. At Verano de Escandalo (2000), she teamed with Aja Kong and Tiffany in a trios tag team match who lost to Alda Moreno, Lady Apache and Ayako Hamada on September 29, 2000. On September 7, 2001, she won the revived UWA World Women's Championship in Nuevo Leon, Mexico. The title had last been won by her sister ten years before. She briefly lost the title to Ayako Hamada on March 8, 2002, but regained it later that year. Janeth also participated in the Reina de Reinas 2001 and 2002 tournaments making it to the finals in both events.

Janeth finally got her moment in the spotlight by winning the Reina de Reinas 2006 tournament defeating Martha Villalobos, Cynthia Moreno and La Diabólica in the four-way elimination finals. The next month at Rey de Reyes (2006), she teamed with Lola Gonzales, Cinthia Moreno and Martha Villalobos in an 8-woman tag team match against Chikayo Nagashima, La Diabolica, Tiffany and Carlos Amano, but lost the match when her team was disqualified. After this point, she and the other luchadoras were gradually phased out with the promotion focusing on the Apache family storyline. In early 2007, Janeth formed a team with Tiffany and Rossy Moreno known as Las Brujas, but the group was short-lived and disappeared from AAA after only a few episodes. She made her last AAA appearance that year reaching the tournament finals at the Reina de Reinas 2007 on March 25, and is unclear whether she has left the company or is just on hiatus for personal reasons.

Championships and accomplishments
Asistencia Asesoría y Administración
AAA Reina de Reinas Championship (1 time)
Reina de Reinas tournament (2006)

Universal Wrestling Association
UWA World Women's Championship (2 time)

Luchas de Apuestas record

Notes

References

External links
Miss Janeth at Cagematch.net
Miss Janeth at WrestlingData.com
Profile Card: Miss Janeth

1973 births
Living people
Mexican female professional wrestlers
Professional wrestlers from Mexico City
AAA Reina de Reinas Champions